Robinson Township is the name of some places in the U.S. state of Pennsylvania:

Robinson Township, Allegheny County, Pennsylvania
Robinson Township, Washington County, Pennsylvania

Pennsylvania township disambiguation pages